Yagnam is a 2004 Indian Telugu-language action film produced by Pokuri Babu Rao on the Eetharam Films banner, directed by A.S. Ravi Kumar Chowdary. It was released on 2 July 2004. It stars Gopichand and Moonmoon Banerjee, with music composed by Mani Sharma. This film was remade in Oriya as Mo Mana Khali tori Pain (2005), starring Siddhant Mahapatra and Madhuri , and in Tamil as Mannin Maindhan, with Sibiraj and Sathyaraj. The film was also later dubbed into Hindi as Aaj Ka Raavanraaj in 2007. The film won two Nandi Awards.

Plot
Seenu (Gopichand) is a loyal servant and the right-hand-man of faction leader Reddeppa (Devaraj). He and Sailaja (Moonmoon Banerjee), Reddeppa's daughter, grew up together. Nayudamma (Vijaya Rangaraju) is an archrival of Reddeppa. Factional feuds between them have resulted in the loss of a number of lives among their groups. When Reddeppa realizes that his daughter and Seenu are in love, he swings into action, trying to kill Seenu. The rest of the story is about how Seenu secures Sailaja's hand in marriage and how he unites the forces of followers in both the warring groups to teach their masters (Reddeppa and Nayudamma) a lesson or two.

Cast
Gopichand as Seenu (Srinu) alias Srinivas
Moonmoon Banerjee as Sailaja / Sailu
Prakash Raj as Inspector Pratap Reddy 
Devaraj as Redappa 
Vijaya Rangaraju as Nayudamma 
Dharmavarapu Subramanyam 
Narra Venkateswara Rao 
Raghu Babu 
Suman Setty 
Jhansi 
Jahnavi Munthaj

Production

The filming occurred in and around Araku Valley, Vishakhapatnam, Ichchapuram, Srikakulam, and Vizianagaram in the Coastal Andhra area, the capital city Hyderabad, and in the outskirts of Kadapa and Kurnool  cities in the Rayalaseema region of Andhra Pradesh.

Soundtrack

The music was composed by Mani Sharma. The music was released on the Maruthi Music Company label.

Awards
Nandi Awards - 2004
Best Male Comedian - Dharmavarapu Subramanyam
Best Female Comedian - Jahnavi

References

External links
 

2000s Telugu-language films
2004 films
Telugu films remade in other languages
Films scored by Mani Sharma